Gallt yr Ogof is a mountain in Snowdonia, North Wales. It is a subsidiary top of Glyder Fawr, and is the most easterly point in the Glyderau mountain range, not including the hill Cefn y Capel. Gallt yr Ogof is 763 metres high.

It is a sister peak to Y Foel Goch, which is located on the ridge heading west to Glyder Fach. As its name suggests there is a cave to be found on the cliffs on the precipitous eastern side of the peak.

References

External links 
 www.geograph.co.uk : photos of Gallt yr Ogof and surrounding area

Capel Curig
Mountains and hills of Conwy County Borough
Mountains and hills of Snowdonia
Hewitts of Wales
Nuttalls